The Inhumas River is a river of Mato Grosso do Sul state in southwestern Brazil.

See also
List of rivers of Mato Grosso do Sul

References
Brazilian Ministry of Transport
 Rand McNally, The New International Atlas, 1993.

Rivers of Mato Grosso do Sul